Wade Allan "Tiny" Campbell (born January 2, 1961) is a Canadian retired professional ice hockey defenceman who played in the National Hockey League for the Winnipeg Jets and the Boston Bruins between 1982 and 1988. Campbell signed with Winnipeg as a free-agent in 1982 as a walk on out of University of Alberta. He went on to play a total of 213 regular season games, scoring 9 goals and 27 assists for 36 points, collecting 305 penalty minutes.  He retired in 1991.

Campbell was born in Peace River, Alberta.

Career statistics

External links

1961 births
Alberta Golden Bears ice hockey players
Boston Bruins players
Boxers de Bordeaux players
Canadian ice hockey defencemen
Cape Breton Oilers players
Ice hockey people from Alberta
Living people
Maine Mariners players
Moncton Golden Flames players
People from Northern Sunrise County
Sherbrooke Canadiens players
Sherbrooke Jets players
Undrafted National Hockey League players
Winnipeg Jets (1979–1996) players